High Spirits is a 1988 fantasy comedy film written and directed by Neil Jordan and starring Steve Guttenberg, Daryl Hannah, Beverly D'Angelo, Liam Neeson and Peter O'Toole. It is an Irish, British and American co-production.

Set in a remote Irish castle called Dromore Castle, Co. Limerick, High Spirits is a topsy-turvy comedy with thematic leanings towards Ireland's rich folklore regarding ghosts and spirits, where the castle starts to come to life with the help of such denizens.

Plot 
Cash-strapped Peter Plunkett owns a dilapidated Irish castle that he has converted to a bed and breakfast. Owing money to an Irish-American businessman named Brogan, Plunkett attempts to turn the castle into "the most haunted castle in Europe" for the tourist trade. Inspired by his mother's stories about the castle being haunted, he and his wacky Irish staff set about creating ghostly costumes and effects for their first group of American guests.

Initially annoyed by the inept "hauntings", the American guests soon discover that Castle Plunkett's real ghosts have taken umbrage at being cheaply exploited and have staged a full-scale paranormal event.

Two ghosts, Mary Plunkett and Martin Brogan, become romantically entangled with two of the American guests. This romantic twist becomes the main focus of the plot.

Cast

Reception 
The film received negative reviews from critics. On Rotten Tomatoes it has a 27% rating based on 15 reviews.

Home media
Scream Factory released the film on Blu-ray Disc in 2015. It was packaged as a double feature with Vampire's Kiss on February 13, 2015.
The film was released on Blu Ray from Final Cut on August 24, 2020 in the UK.

See also 
 List of ghost films

References

External links 
 
 
 

1988 films
1980s fantasy comedy films
1980s ghost films
American fantasy comedy films
American haunted house films
British ghost films
1980s English-language films
English-language Irish films
Films scored by George Fenton
Films directed by Neil Jordan
Films set in castles
Films set in Ireland
British fantasy comedy films
Irish fantasy comedy films
Palace Pictures films
TriStar Pictures films
1988 comedy films
1980s American films
1980s British films